Provash Ghosh is the  General Secretary of the Socialist Unity Centre of India (Communist) [SUCI(C)]. He was elected to the position by the central committee of the party on 4 March 2010 following the death of Nihar Mukherjee who was elected to the office by the second party congress of the SUCI(C) in November 2009. As per the constitution of the party, the central committee can elect the General Secretary within the Congress, if the elected general secretary dies. 
Provash Ghosh was elected to the party politburo during the second party congress.
.

References

Socialist Unity Centre of India (Communist) politicians
Living people
Indian atheists
Stalinism
Anti-revisionists
Indian political writers
1937 births
20th-century Indian politicians
Indian Communist writers
West Bengal politicians
Journalists from West Bengal
Bengali Hindus
20th-century Bengalis
Indian newspaper editors